Lake City Secondary School is a public Middle school in Williams Lake in the Canadian province of British Columbia. The school is administered as part of School District 27 Cariboo-Chilcotin. It is a grade 7-9 facility enrolling approximately 808 students. The principal is Craig Munroe.  

The school provides an international exchange program, allowing learners to experience education abroad.

References

High schools in British Columbia
Educational institutions established in 1967
1967 establishments in British Columbia